David Nilsson may refer to:

David Nilsson (runner) (born 1987), Swedish long-distance runner
David Nilsson (footballer) (born 1991), Swedish-Macedonian footballer

See Also
Dave Nilsson (born 1969), Australian baseball player